Arcaño is a Spanish surname. Notable people with the surname include:

Antonio Arcaño (1911–1994), Cuban flautist and bandleader
Alfredo Arcaño (1868–?), Cuban baseball player

Spanish-language surnames